Platychora ulmi is a plant pathogen infecting elms.

References

External links 
 Index Fungorum
 USDA ARS Fungal Database

Fungal tree pathogens and diseases
Venturiaceae
Fungi described in 1805